Magenta Telekom (T-Mobile Austria until 6 May 2019) is the second largest mobile and fixed company in Austria. It is owned by Deutsche Telekom. In 2017 it had 5.7 million customers. Its CEO is Andreas Bierwirth[de]since 1 September 2012.

History 

The company was founded as max.mobil in 1996 by the Ö-Call consortium. In 2000, the company was bought by Deutsche Telekom. In 2002, max.mobil was renamed to T-Mobile Austria.

tele.ring acquisition 
In 2005, T-Mobile Austria acquired mobile provider tele.ring from its parent company Western Wireless Corporation for 1.3 billion euros, and transformed it into its own lower-cost flanker brand. The tele.ring branding was discontinued on 23 March 2020.

UPC Austria acquisition 
In December 2017, T-Mobile Austria announced it would acquire cable provider UPC Austria (originally founded in 1977 as Telekabel Wien) from its parent company Liberty Global for 1.9 billion euros. The acquisition was approved by the European Commission on 10 July 2018.

The company announced plans to retire the "T-Mobile" and "UPC" brands in 2019, merging the companies under a single "T" brand. The new brand name was announced on the evening of 6 May 2019.

References 

Mobile phone companies of Austria
Deutsche Telekom